Jamesville High School was a public high school located in Jamesville, North Carolina. It was one of four high schools in Martin County Schools and closed circa 2010. Students formerly served by this school are now served by Riverside High School.

References

Defunct schools in North Carolina
Schools in Martin County, North Carolina